The West Indies cricket team, captained by Alvin Kallicharran, toured India and Sri Lanka from November 1978 to February 1979 and played a six-match Test series against the India national cricket team. India won the series 1–0. In Sri Lanka, the West Indians played two internationals against the Sri Lanka national cricket team which had not then achieved Test status; therefore, the internationals played at the Paikiasothy Saravanamuttu Stadium and the Sinhalese Sports Club Ground, both in Colombo, are classified as first-class matches. India were captained by Sunil Gavaskar and Sri Lanka by Anura Tennekoon.It was first test series win for India at home against West Indies

Test series summary

First Test

Second Test

Third Test

Fourth Test

Fifth Test

Sixth Test

References

External links
West Indies in India and Sri Lanka 1978-79.html at CricketArchive

Further reading
 Dicky Rutnagur, "West Indies in India and Sri Lanka, 1978-79", Wisden 1980, pp. 980-1005.

1978 in Indian cricket
1978 in West Indian cricket
1979 in Indian cricket
1979 in Sri Lankan cricket
1979 in West Indian cricket
Indian cricket seasons from 1970–71 to 1999–2000
International cricket competitions from 1975–76 to 1980
Sri Lankan cricket seasons from 1972–73 to 1999–2000
1978-79
1979